BWI Business District station is a Baltimore Light Rail station in the BWI Business District, north of the Baltimore-Washington International Airport in Linthicum, Maryland. There are currently 36 free public parking spaces and connections can be made to MTA Maryland's Route 17 and 99 buses, and Howard Transit's Silver Route from this station. Additionally, portions of the BWI Trail can be found across the street from the parking lot.

Station layout

References

External links

 Schedules
 Station from Google Maps Street View

Baltimore Light Rail stations
Linthicum, Maryland
Railway stations in the United States opened in 1997
1997 establishments in Maryland
Railway stations in Anne Arundel County, Maryland
Business District Station